The XXI Mountain Corps was a German military formation in World War II.

At the beginning of November 1944 the XXI Mountain Corps retreated from Albania to Podgorica in Montenegro. In mid-November they tried to break through Danilovgrad and Nikšić toward Sarajevo, but Yugoslav partisan forces supported by two British artillery batteries, code-named Floydforce, stopped them after ten days fighting. At the end of November 1944 they had to retreat through a much longer route, via Kolašin, Prijepolje and Višegrad.

Commanders 
 Paul Bader (25 August 1943 - 10 October 1943)
 Gustav Fehn (10 October 1943 -20 July 1944)
 Ernst von Leyser (20 July 1944 -29 April 1945) 
 Hartwig von Ludwiger (29 April 1945 - 8 May 1945)

Hartwig von Ludwiger was put on the trial after WWII and hanged in 1947.

References

Sources 

 
 
 

Mountain corps of Germany in World War II